Keith Hartwig is a former wide receiver in the National Football League.

Biography
Hartwig was born Malcolm Keith Hartwig on December 10, 1953 in Corona del Mar, Newport Beach, California.

Career
Hartwig was drafted in the eleventh round of the 1977 NFL Draft by the Minnesota Vikings and played that season with the Green Bay Packers. He played at the collegiate level at the University of Arizona.

See also
List of Green Bay Packers players

References

1953 births
Sportspeople from Newport Beach, California
Green Bay Packers players
American football wide receivers
University of Arizona alumni
Arizona Wildcats football players
Living people